When Nature Calls with Helen Mirren is an American comedy series that aired on ABC from June 24, 2021 to January 1, 2022.

According to ABC, the series "features comedians putting words into the mouths of beautiful beasts, teeny-tiny frogs, beatboxing badgers and more in captivating footage from all over the world."

Production 
On April 6, 2021, it was announced that ABC had ordered the series with Ryan O'Dowd as executive producer, alongside K.P. Anderson. On April 7, 2021, it was announced that the series would premiere on June 17, 2021, later being rescheduled to June 24, 2021. It was also announced that Helen Mirren would serve as the narrator of the show.

The series is produced by BBC Studios, and is an adaptation of the BBC show Walk on the Wild Side.

Episodes

Ratings

References

External links 
 
 

2020s American comedy television series
2021 American television series debuts
2022 American television series endings
American Broadcasting Company original programming
American television series based on British television series
English-language television shows
Television series about animals
Television series by BBC Studios